Thaumatovalva is a genus of moths belonging to the family Tortricidae. The genus was erected by Alicia E. Timm and John Wesley Brown in 2014.

Species
Thaumatovalva albolineana Timm & Brown, 2014
Thaumatovalva deprinsorum Timm & Brown, 2014
Thaumatovalva limbata (Diakonoff, 1969)
Thaumatovalva spinai (Razowski & Trematerra, 2010)

Etymology
The genus name is derived from Latin thaumato (meaning miracle, wonder) and the morphological term valva.

See also
List of Tortricidae genera

References

 ;  2014: A new genus of Grapholitini from Africa related to Thaumatotibia (Lepidoptera, Tortricidae). ZooKeys, 438: 113-128. 

Grapholitini